Darko Ðukić (born 11 December 1994) is a Serbian handball player who plays for RK Vardar 1961 and the Serbian national team.

He competed at the 2016 European Men's Handball Championship.

Honors 
 Macedonian Handball Super League
 Winner: 2022
 Macedonian Handball Cup
 Winner: 2022

References

1994 births
Living people
Serbian male handball players
Sportspeople from Niš
Expatriate handball players in Turkey
Serbian expatriate sportspeople in Poland
Serbian expatriate sportspeople in Turkey
Serbian expatriate sportspeople in North Macedonia
Vive Kielce players